Xpander may refer to:

Oberheim Xpander, an analog synthesizer introduced by Oberheim in 1984
Xpander (EP), by Sasha, 1999
HP Xpander, a touch-screen calculator by Hewlett-Packard in 2001
Math Xpander, a software package for Windows CE handhelds by Hewlett-Packard in 2001
Mitsubishi Xpander, a multi-purpose vehicle

See also
 Expander (disambiguation)